Lanivo is a town and commune in Madagascar in the district of Vohipeno, which is a part of Vatovavy-Fitovinany Region. The population of the commune was estimated to be approximately 9,000 in the 2001 commune census.

Primary is the only schooling available.  95% of the population are farmers and 4.7% raise livestock. The most important crop is coffee, followed by sugarcane, lychee, and rice.  0.2% of the population works in the service industry and 0.1% works in the fishing industry.

References and notes 

Populated places in Vatovavy-Fitovinany